Warner Fusselle (April 7, 1944 – June 10, 2012) was an American sportscaster remembered for contributions to the television shows This Week in Baseball and Major League Baseball Magazine, and for his memorable Southern voice.  He was an announcer for several Minor League Baseball teams such as the Spartanburg Phillies, Richmond Braves, and the Brooklyn Cyclones from 2001 until his death from a heart attack at age 68.

In August 2017, Fusselle was inducted into the New York-Penn League Hall of Fame.

References

External links

1944 births
2012 deaths
American radio sports announcers
American television sports announcers
Major League Baseball broadcasters
Sportspeople from Louisville, Kentucky
Radio personalities from Louisville, Kentucky
Television personalities from Louisville, Kentucky
American Basketball Association announcers